The Methodist Cemetery is an historic cemetery, located at Murdock Mill Road, between River Road, and 42nd Street, Northwest, Washington, D.C., in the Tenleytown neighborhood. 

It is located behind the Eldbrooke United Methodist Church, also on the National Register of Historic Places.

History
It was established in 1855, behind Mount Zion Methodist, renamed Eldbrooke United Methodist Church, and now The City Church.

It was listed in the District of Columbia Inventory of Historic Sites in 2008 and the NRHP since September 5, 2008.

References

External links
 

1855 establishments in Washington, D.C.
Cemeteries on the National Register of Historic Places in Washington, D.C.
Methodist cemeteries